Mary Elizabeth McHughes Ferrell (26 October 1922 – 20 February 2004) was an American historian and independent researcher who created a large database on the John F. Kennedy assassination.

Life and career
Born in Memphis, Tennessee, she married Hubert Afton "Buck" Ferrell in 1940 and had four children. In 1957 the family moved to Dallas, Texas, where Ferrell found work as a legal secretary.

She began collecting materials on the Kennedy assassination immediately after the event. Her assassination database was originally written on over 40,000 cards and included details of over 8,200 people involved in the case. These data were eventually entered into a computer. Ferrell also created a four-volume set of chronologies, covering all aspects of the assassination.

Ferrell died in Dallas.

Foundation 

The Mary Ferrell Foundation, located in Ipswich, Massachusetts, is a non-profit. Topics include the 1960s assassinations, the Watergate scandal, and post-Watergate intelligence abuse.

References

External links
Mary Ferrell biography via Mary Ferrell Foundation

Photo of Mary Ferrell
Mary Ferrell web site

1922 births
2004 deaths
Researchers of the assassination of John F. Kennedy
20th-century American historians
American women historians
20th-century American women writers